Azghad (also known as Zeghey is a village in Torqabeh Rural District, Torqabeh District, Torqabeh and Shandiz County, Razavi Khorasan Province, Iran. At the 2006 census, its population was 447, in 140 families.

Gallery

See also 

 List of cities, towns and villages in Razavi Khorasan Province

References 

Populated places in Torqabeh and Shandiz County